The speckled tree frog (Boana semiguttata)  is a species of frog in the family Hylidae found in Argentina, Brazil, and possibly Paraguay. Its natural habitats are subtropical or tropical moist lowland forests, rivers, rural gardens, and heavily degraded former forests. It is threatened by habitat loss.

References

semiguttata
Amphibians described in 1925
Taxonomy articles created by Polbot